The 1990–91 Benson & Hedges World Series was a One Day International (ODI) cricket tri-series where Australia played host to England and New Zealand. Australia and New Zealand reached the Finals, which Australia won 2–0. New Zealand and England contested the tri-series for the first time since the 1982-83 season

Points Table

Matches

Final series
Australia won the best of three final series against New Zealand 2–0.

References

Australian Tri-Series
1990 in cricket
1990–91 Australian cricket season
1991 in cricket
1990–91
International cricket competitions from 1988–89 to 1991
1990 in Australian cricket
1991 in Australian cricket
1990–91
1990 in New Zealand cricket
1991 in New Zealand cricket